Joseph Bowler (born 1928, Forest Hills, New York) is an artist and illustrator.

Bowler was a regular illustrator for the likes of Cosmopolitan Magazine and Ladies' Home Journal in the Second Illustrative Golden Age after the Second World War.

An apprentice of the Charles E. Cooper Art Studio in New York, Bowler was named The Artists' Guild of New York Artist of the Year in 1967. The award was a break for Bowler, who between 1968 and 1971 illustrated Rose Fitzgerald Kennedy for Ladies' Home Journal, and David Eisenhower and his wife Julie for The Saturday Evening Post.

In 1958, Bowler was stricken with polio.

He was named in the Society of Illustrators Hall of Fame in 1992.

References

1928 births
American illustrators
20th-century American painters
American male painters
21st-century American painters
21st-century American male artists
Living people
People from Forest Hills, Queens
Painters from New York City
20th-century American male artists